Hughson is a surname. Notable people with the surname include:

Fred Hughson (1914–1987), Australian rules footballer
Jim Hughson (born 1956), Canadian television sportscaster
Les Hughson (1907–1985), Australian rules footballer
Nathaniel Hughson (1755–1837), American city founder
Tex Hughson (1916–1993), American baseball player

English-language surnames
Patronymic surnames
Surnames from given names